The Jamaica women's national volleyball team represents Jamaica in international women's volleyball competitions and friendly matches.

They compete at the Caribbean Volleyball Championship.

Recently, they placed second in the 2017 Caribbean Zonal Volleyball Association's (CAZOVA) Women's Championship held in Kingston, Jamaica. With a second-place finish, they qualified to compete in the 3rd round of the FIVB World Championship Qualifications, where they will play Guatemala, Puerto Rico, and Dominican Republic. The top two from this competition will qualify for the 2018 World Championships, hosted by Japan.

References
Jamaica Volleyball Federation
http://www.cazova.org/news/2017/08/tt-dominate-cazova-awards.aspx

National women's volleyball teams
Volleyball
Volleyball in Jamaica
Women's sport in Jamaica